Dilshod Saidzhonovich Vasiyev (born 12 February 1988 in Dushanbe, Soviet Union) is a Tajikistani football midfielder.

Career

Club
During 2008, Vasiyev played for FC Mika in the Armenian Premier League, playing a total of 20 times, 19 in the league.

Vasiyev scored FC Istiklol's first Tajik League goal on 4 April 2009.

In September 2016, Vasiyev was ruled out for three-months with a torn Medial collateral ligament.

On 21 January 2019, Istiklol announced that Vasiyev had left after 10-years with the club.

On 5 February 2019, FK Khujand announced the singing of Vasiyev.

On 31 March 2020, Vasiyev was announced as part of CSKA Pamir Dushanbe's squad for the 2020 season.

Personal life
His brother, Farkhod is also a professional footballer.

Career statistics

Club

International

Statistics accurate as of match played 10 October 2017

International goals
Scores and results list Tajikistan's goal tally first.

Non-FIFA International goals

Honors
Istiklol
 Tajik League (7): 2010, 2011, 2014, 2015, 2016, 2017, 2018
 Tajik Cup (5): 2009, 2010, 2013, 2014, 2016, 2018
 Tajik Supercup (3) : 2014, 2016, 2018
AFC President's Cup (1): 2012

Individual
 Tajik League Top Goalscorer (3) 2012, 2014, 2017

References

External links

Profile at FFA website

1988 births
Living people
Tajikistani footballers
Tajikistani expatriate footballers
FC Mika players
Expatriate footballers in Armenia
Tajikistani expatriate sportspeople in Armenia
Association football midfielders
Tajikistan international footballers
Armenian Premier League players
FC Istiklol players
Footballers at the 2006 Asian Games
Footballers at the 2014 Asian Games
Sportspeople from Dushanbe
Asian Games competitors for Tajikistan
Tajikistan Higher League players
Tajikistan youth international footballers